Muhammad Rafiq Faeez bin Muhammad Fuad (born 21 March 1993) is a Malaysian footballer who plays as a centre-back for PKNP.

References

External links
 

1993 births
Living people
Malaysian footballers
Malaysia Super League players
Perak F.C. players
PKNP FC players
Association football defenders